Bling Bling is slang for flashy, ostentatious, or elaborate jewelry and ornamented accessories.

Bling Bling and variants may also refer to:
"Bling Bling" (song), a 1999 song by American rapper B.G.
Bling Bling (video), a 2001 DVD by fictional character Ali G
Bling! Bling!, a 2003 album by American band Lynam
Bling Bling (EP), a 2011 EP by South Korean girl group Dal Shabet
Bling, Bling, an episode from American animation Shimmer and Shine
Bling Bling, a song from South Korean boy band iKon's 2016 album New Kids: Begin
Bling Bling, a six-member South Korean girl group
Bling Bling, the old name for the 2006 video game Saints Row.